Freedom is the first EP and fourth studio album by Taiwanese singer-songwriter Eric Chou, released by Sony Music Taiwan on 10 January 2019. The deluxe edition of the EP was released as the studio album on 24 December 2019. The tracks were inspired by Western pop music Chou grew up with when he studied in the United States. The work demonstrates Chou's creative energy, representing music from his debut to the present by further exploring the EDM genre and R&B.

Background and release 
Chou participated in the Tencent competition Chao Yin Idols in August 2018. He co-wrote the song "What's Wrong" with Chinese singer and actor Wu Jiacheng, writing the verse and the bridge parts. The song is inspired by Chinese singer Su Yunying's "Fairy" from her debut album Ming Ming. The live version performed by Chou, Wu, and Su, which included the chorus of the song "Fairy" was released digitally on Chinese streaming platforms on the same month. In December 2018, Chou released the single, "Nobody But Me", along with its music video.

For the previous album, The Chaos After You, Chou flew to Sweden to collaborate with Swedish producer Freddy Häggstam to incorporate different musical styles in his songs such as EDM. Chou would eventually co-produce the EP with Häggstam. In January 2019, Chou held a listening party for his then upcoming EP, where he also announced his relationship with news anchor Dacie Chao. According to Chou, he did not have the motivation to write songs during his past relationships, but the new relationship gave him a lot of inspiration, noting that love can create love songs that can move people. Chou added that he couldn't write love songs before when he was happy and not in pain, but now he can.

The EP was officially released on 10 January 2019 along with the music video of "What's Wrong".

On 14 February 2019, Chou released the music video for "At Least I Remember" which he first performed at the 15th KKBOX Music Awards the previous month. The music video marked Chou's directorial debut. On 4 April 2019, the music video for the title song "Freedom" which was filmed using Apple's iPhone XS Max, was released.

In August 2019, Chou released his single "Something about LA", and "Forever Beautiful" in support for a breast cancer campaign in October 2019. Both songs appeared on the deluxe version of the EP which became Chou's fourth studio album released on 24 December 2019.

Track listing

References 
2019 albums
Eric Chou albums